Xavier Stierli (born 29 October 1940) is a Swiss football midfielder who played for Switzerland in the 1966 FIFA World Cup. He also played for FC Zürich.

References

External links
FIFA profile

1940 births
Swiss men's footballers
Switzerland international footballers
Association football midfielders
FC Zürich players
1966 FIFA World Cup players
Living people